Hugo John Smelter Young (13 October 1938 – 22 September 2003) was a British journalist and columnist and senior political commentator at The Guardian.

Early life and education
Born in Sheffield into an old recusant Roman Catholic family, he was head boy at Ampleforth College in North Yorkshire during his youth; later, he read law at Balliol College, Oxford, and worked for the Yorkshire Post in Leeds from 1961. In 1963, he spent a year as a Harkness Fellow in the US and he spent the next year working as a congressional fellow.

Journalistic career
In 1965, Young returned to the United Kingdom. He was recruited by Denis Hamilton of The Sunday Times. In his second year there, he became chief leader writer, a position he kept until 1977. From 1973–84, he was also the paper's political editor. He established a Sunday column, "Inside Politics", that made him famous. Beginning in 1981, he also held the position of joint deputy editor. However, Young's relationship with The Sunday Times cooled notably when Rupert Murdoch took over the paper in 1981. The conflict culminated in a series of battles with editor Andrew Neil, particularly over the US invasion of Grenada in 1983. This ultimately led to Young's leaving The Sunday Times and joining The Guardian in 1984.

Young continued to write a twice-weekly political column at The Guardian until his death. Young was a strong proponent of European integration, and sharply expressed his disappointment with the British government's eurosceptic politics in his columns, including Prime Minister Tony Blair's decision to side with George W. Bush instead of his EU partners in the 2003 invasion of Iraq.

Despite these differences, Young remained on good terms with senior ministers, including Tony Blair and Margaret Thatcher. He wrote a critical biography of the latter, One of Us (1989), in addition to a very critical article he wrote two weeks before his death but which was not published until after Thatcher's death, nearly ten years after his own. He wrote other books, including This Blessed Plot: Britain And Europe From Churchill To Blair, which was published in 1998. From 1989 onwards, Young was the chairman of the Scott Trust, which owns The Guardian and other news media, and helped the paper through important developments such as the purchase of The Observer. His papers are held at the Guardian News & Media Archive in London.

The Hugo Young Lecture
There is now an annual Hugo Young lecture, organised by The Guardian in Young's memory. It has been delivered by David Cameron, Nick Clegg, Ed Miliband, Marjorie Scardino and Alex Salmond.

Personal life

Young married twice. His first wife, Helen Mason died in 1989 of lung cancer. They had three daughters, including the film director Emily Young, and one son. 

He remarried in 1990, this time to American artist Lucy Waring. Young died at the age of 64 of colon cancer and was buried on the west side of Highgate Cemetery.

Bibliography
The Hugo Young Papers: Thirty years of British politics – off the record (18 November 2008)  (published posthumously)
Supping with the Devils: Political Journalism (2003) 
Political Lives (2001) 
This Blessed Plot: Britain and Europe from Churchill to Blair (1998) 
Thatcherism: Did society survive? (The Maisie Ward Sheed memorial lecture) (1992)  
One of Us: Life of Margaret Thatcher (1989) 
The Iron Lady: A Biography of Margaret Thatcher (1989)  (US edition of "One of Us" – there is a US biography of Richard Nixon entitled "One of Us")
But, Chancellor: Inquiry into the Treasury (1984) 
No, Minister (1982)  
The Thatcher Phenomenon (1986) 
Crossman Affair (1976)

References

External links
 Column archive at the London Review of Books
 
 
 
 * 
 The papers of Hugo Young at the Guardian News & Media Archive

Obituaries
Guardian columnist Hugo Young dies at BBC News
Hugo Young, Donal Macintyre, The Independent
Hugo Young, Leading British Columnist, Is Dead at 64, Warren Hoge, The New York Times

1938 births
2003 deaths
Burials at Highgate Cemetery
British male journalists
Harkness Fellows
The Guardian journalists
Writers from Sheffield
Alumni of Balliol College, Oxford
The Sunday Times people
People educated at Ampleforth College
Deaths from colorectal cancer
Deaths from cancer in England
Place of death missing